Miss Colombia 2004, the 70th Miss Colombia pageant, was held in Cartagena de Indias, Colombia, on November 12, 2004, after three weeks of events.  The winner of the pageant was Adriana Tarud, Miss Atlántico.

The pageant was broadcast live on RCN TV from the Centro de Convenciones Julio Cesar Turbay in Cartagena de Indias, Colombia. At the conclusion of the final night of competition, outgoing titleholder Catherine Daza Manchola crowned Adriana Tarud of Atlántico as the new Miss Colombia.

Results

Placements

Special awards
 Miss Photogenic (voted by press reporters) - Silvana Patricia Altahona López (Meta)
 Best Body Figura Bodytech - Valerie Dominguez Tarud  (Atlántico)
 Miss Congeniality - Liliana del Carmen Morales Barrios (Bolívar)
 Best Costume - Ana María Castañeda (Sucre)
 Reina de la Policia - Claudia Margarita González Dangond (Cesar)
 Señorita Puntualidad - Claudia Margarita González Dangond (Cesar)
 Miss Elegance - Karina Guerra Rodriguez (Chocó)

Delegates
The Miss Colombia 2004 delegates were:

Antioquia - Tatiana Maria Bastidas Castañeda
Atlántico - Adriana Cecilia Tarud Duran
Bogotá - Nawal Michelle Ayoub Valderrama
Bolívar - Lia Patricia Correal Lopera
Boyacá - Yuri Alix Cruz Suarez
Caldas - Juliana Villegas Jimenez
Cartagena DT y C - Katya Victoria Lopez Velez
Cesar - Maria Martha Lacouture Maya
Chocó - Carmen Lizeth Rivas Abadia
Córdoba - Ana María Burgos Mendoza
Cundinamarca - Alejandra Milena Aldana Saavedra
Guajira - Aylen Adeline Borrego Areyanes
Huila - Natalia Tamayo Palacio
Magdalena - Laura Maria Abisambra Zuñiga
Meta - Deyanira Aguirre Barrero
Norte de Santander - Diana Milena Cepeda Castro
Quindío - Laura Marcela Fernández Zuluaga
Risaralda - Juliana Upegui Saldarriaga
San Andrés and Providencia - Paola Andrea Gallardo Zakzuk
Santander - Linda Vannesa Consuegra Leal
Tolima - Maria Julia Quessep Bitar
Valle - Diana Arbelaez Gonzalez

References and footnotes

External links
Official site

Miss Colombia
2004 in Colombia
2004 beauty pageants